The Paman  languages are an Australian language family spoken on Cape York Peninsula, Queensland. First noted by Kenneth Hale, Paman is noteworthy for the profound phonological changes which have affected some of its descendants.

Classification 
Various classifications of the Paman languages exist. The one outlined below is that of R. M. W. Dixon, though he does not accept that these branches are necessarily related to each other.

Geographically, running down the east coast, they are:
North Cape York
Northern Paman
Umpila
Umbindhamu †
Lamalamic
Umbuygamu †
Lamu-Lamu
 Yalgawarra †
Yalanjic
Guugu Yimithirr
Guugu Yalandji
Barrow Point † (>> Wik?)
Mbariman-Gudhinma †
 Djabugay †

Down the west coast, they are: 
North Cape York
Northern Paman
Wik
Southwestern
Upper Southwest Paman
Kuuk Thaayorre
Kuuk Yak †
Kunjen (incl. Ogh Undjan)
Yir-Yoront (incl. Yirrk-Thangalkl) †
Koko-Bera (incl. Gugu Dhaw)
Kok-Nar †
Norman Paman
Kurtjar
Kuthant †
Gugadj †

In the interior, south of Wik, they are:
Thaypan
Gugu Thaypan (?Rarmul) †
Aghu Tharrnggala †
Ikarranggal-Alungul-Angkula
Ikarranggal †
Alungul †
Angkula †
Takalak †
Southern
Agwamin †
Mbabaram †
Mbara †
Walangama †

The name Gugu Mini means 'good speech', and has been applied to several languages in the Thaypan area. 'Possum language' (Koko-Possum, Gugu Yawa) is another generic name of this area.

The unclassified Marrett River language (†) was presumably Paman, though distinct from its neighbors, as presumably was Wik Paach (†). The Mayabic languages (†) to the southwest were once classified as Paman, but have been excluded in Bowern (2011). Alodja may have been another Thaypan / Rarmul Pama language.

See also
Pama–Maran languages

Notes

References 
 

 
Indigenous Australian languages in Queensland